Lorna Tonks (born 8 December 1988) is an English-born Australian breaststroke swimmer. In 2014, she was a member of the 4×100-metre medley teams that won gold medals at the Commonwealth Games and Pan Pacific Championships.

References

External links
 
 

1988 births
Living people
Australian female breaststroke swimmers
Swimmers at the 2014 Commonwealth Games
World Aquatics Championships medalists in swimming
Commonwealth Games gold medallists for Australia
Commonwealth Games medallists in swimming
Medallists at the 2014 Commonwealth Games